Polar Knowledge Canada is an agency of the Government of Canada under the Indigenous and Northern Affairs Canada portfolio.

It is responsible for monitoring, promoting, and disseminating knowledge of the polar regions, contributing to public awareness of the importance of polar science to Canada, enhancing Canada's international profile as a circumpolar nation, and recommending polar science policy direction to government.

The agency was established when the former Canadian Polar Commission, formed in 1991, and the Canadian High Arctic Research Station was merged into one unit in 2015. Its main office is at the Canadian High Arctic Research Station in Cambridge Bay, Nunavut.

External links 
 Polar Knowledge Canada

Federal departments and agencies of Canada
Crown-Indigenous Relations and Northern Development Canada
Northern Canada
2015 establishments in Canada
Government agencies established in 2015